Andrea Molaioli is an Italian film director and screenwriter. His film credits include The Girl by the Lake and The Jewel.

Filmography

Films
The Girl by the Lake (2007)
The Jewel (2011)

References

External links
 

Italian film directors
Italian screenwriters
Italian male screenwriters
David di Donatello winners
Nastro d'Argento winners
Living people
Year of birth missing (living people)